Atherigona ponti is a species of fly in the family Muscidae. It is a pest of millets.

References

Muscidae
Insect pests of millets